Toll is a residential locality of Charters Towers in the Charters Towers Region, Queensland, Australia. In the  Toll had a population of 696 people.

History 
In the 2011 census, Toll had a population of 412 people.

In the  Toll had a population of 696 people.

Heritage listings 

Toll has a number of heritage-listed sites, including:
 Bore Sight Range and Compass Swinging Platform

Education
There are no schools in Toll. The nearest government primary schools are Richmond Hill State School in neighbouring Richmond Hill to the south and Charters Towers Central State School in Charters Towers City to the south. The nearest government secondary school is Charters Towers State High School in Charters Towers City.

References

Suburbs of Charters Towers
Localities in Queensland